Cornelia Bouhon (1757 – 1823) was a Dutch stage actor, ballet dancer and opera singer.

Life

She was born to the actors Johannes Bouhon (1729/30-1791) and Cornelia Ghijben (1733-1790?).

She was engaged at the Amsterdamse Schouwburg in 1766-1797 and then at Ward Bingley's theatre company.

She was active as a ballet dancer until 1778. She also performed as an opera singer in addition to performing as a stage actor. She was known for her role in her parts of young heroine.

References 

1757 births
1823 deaths
Dutch stage actresses
19th-century Dutch actresses
18th-century Dutch actresses
18th-century Dutch opera singers
19th-century Dutch opera singers
18th-century Dutch ballet dancers
19th-century Dutch ballet dancers